The Bean Bowl was a non-NCAA-sanctioned American college football bowl game played in Scottsbluff, Nebraska, in 1949 and 1950.

Results

References 

Defunct college football bowls